Ko Jeong-woon (born 27 June 1966) is a South Korean football manager and former player. He was South Korea's most threatening forward in the 1994 FIFA World Cup. His tireless dribbles made Spain and Germany difficult to keep solid defence, and sent off Miguel Ángel Nadal. That year, he also showed his best performances in the K League, winning the title and the MVP award. He interested Bayer Leverkusen, and negotiated with them in Germany after the end of the season. However, Ilhwa's director strongly opposed and scuttled Ko's deal, and the cancellation became his lifelong resentment. He is currently manager of Gimpo FC.

Career statistics

Club

International

Scores and results list South Korea's goal tally first.

Managerial statistics

Honours

Player
Cheonan Ilhwa Chunma
K League 1: 1993, 1994, 1995
Korean League Cup: 1992
Asian Club Championship: 1995
Asian Super Cup: 1996
Afro-Asian Club Championship: 1996

Pohang Steelers
Korean FA Cup runner-up: 2001

South Korea
Asian Games bronze medal: 1990

Individual
K League Rookie of the Year: 1989
K League 1 Best XI: 1991, 1994, 1995, 1999
K League 1 Most Valuable Player: 1994
K League 1 top assist provider: 1994

Manager
Gimpo FC
K3 League: 2021

References

External links 
 
 Ko Jeong-woon at KFA 
 
 
 

1966 births
Living people
South Korean footballers
K League 1 players
K League 1 Most Valuable Player Award winners
J1 League players
1994 FIFA World Cup players
1996 AFC Asian Cup players
Seongnam FC players
Pohang Steelers players
Cerezo Osaka players
FC Seoul non-playing staff
FC Anyang managers
Gimpo FC managers
Association football midfielders
Association football forwards
Expatriate footballers in Japan
South Korean expatriate sportspeople in Japan
South Korean expatriate footballers
South Korea B international footballers
South Korea international footballers
Konkuk University alumni
Asian Games medalists in football
Footballers at the 1990 Asian Games
Footballers at the 1994 Asian Games
Medalists at the 1990 Asian Games
Asian Games bronze medalists for South Korea
South Korean Buddhists
Sportspeople from North Jeolla Province